Year 1477 (MCDLXXVII) was a common year starting on Wednesday (link will display the full calendar) of the Julian calendar.

Events 
 January–December 
 January 5 – Battle of Nancy: Charles the Bold of Burgundy is again defeated, and this time is killed; this marks the end of the Burgundian Wars.
 February? – Volcano Bardarbunga erupts, with a VEI of 6.
 February 11 – Mary of Burgundy, the daughter of Charles the Bold, is forced by her disgruntled subjects to sign the Great Privilege, by which the Flemish cities recover all the local and communal rights which have been abolished by the decrees of the dukes of Burgundy, in their efforts to create in the Low Countries a centralized state.
 February 27 – Uppsala University is founded, becoming the first university in Sweden and all of Scandinavia.
 August 19 – Mary of Burgundy marries Maximilian I, Holy Roman Emperor, in Ghent, bringing her Flemish and Burgundian lands into the Holy Roman Empire, and detaching them from France.
 November 18 – William Caxton produces Earl Rivers' translation into English of Dictes or Sayengis of the Philosophres, at his press in Westminster, the first full-length book printed in England on a printing press.

Undated
 Ivan III of Russia marches against the Novgorod Republic, marking the beginning of Russian Colonialism.
 Giovanni Pico della Mirandola starts to study canon law, at the University of Bologna.
 Thomas Norton (alchemist) writes Ordinall of Alchemy.
 The first edition of The Travels of Marco Polo is printed.

Births 
 January 13 – Henry Percy, 5th Earl of Northumberland (d. 1527)
 January 14 – Hermann of Wied, German Catholic archbishop (d. 1552)
 January 16 – Johannes Schöner, German astronomer and cartographer (d. 1547)
 January 25 – Anne of Brittany, sovereign duchess of Brittany, queen of Charles VIII of France (d. 1514)
 March 20 – Jerome Emser, German theologian (d. 1527)
 June 22 – Thomas Grey, 2nd Marquess of Dorset, English noble (d. 1530)
 July 4 – Johannes Aventinus, Bavarian historian and philologist (d. 1534)
 July 12 – Jacopo Sadoleto, Italian cardinal (d. 1547)
 September 1 – Bartolomeo Fanfulla, Italian mercenary (d. 1525)
 September 19 – Ferrante d'Este, Ferrarese nobleman and condottiero (d. 1540)
 September 21 – Matthäus Zell, German Lutheran pastor (d. 1548)
 date unknown – István Báthory, Hungarian nobleman (d. 1534)
 probable
 Giorgione, painter in Italian High Renaissance (d. 1510)
 Girolamo del Pacchia, Italian painter (d. 1533)
 Lambert Simnel, pretender to the throne of England (d. c. 1534)
 Il Sodoma, Italian painter (d. 1549)
 Thomas Boleyn, 1st Earl of Wiltshire, English diplomat (d. 1539)

Deaths 
 January 2
 Franzone, Italian assassin (executed)
 Gerolamo Olgiati, Italian assassin (executed)
 Carlo Visconti, Italian assassin (executed)
 January 5 – Charles the Bold, Duke of Burgundy (in battle) (b. 1433)
 January 6 – Jean VIII, Count of Vendôme
 January 15 – Adriana of Nassau-Siegen, consort of Count Philip I of Hanau-Münzenberg (b. 1449)
 June 27 – Adolf, Duke of Guelders and Count of Zutphen (1465–1471) (b. 1438)
 August 4 – Jacques d'Armagnac, Duke of Nemours
 August 11 – Latino Orsini, Italian Catholic cardinal (b. 1411)
 December 19 – Maria of Mangup, Princess-consort of Moldavia
 date unknown – Charlotte de Brézé, French countess  (b. 1446)

References